Esra Gümüş Kirici (born 2 October 1982 in Ankara) is a former Turkish volleyball player. She is 181 cm and plays as an outside hitter. She is a former team captain of the Turkey women's national volleyball team. She started her career with VakıfBank Istanbul in 1995 to 2000. Then she played for Yeşilyurt between 2000 and 2004. She transferred to Eczacıbaşı VitrA in 2004. She played for Sariyer Belediyesi before she quit volleyball.

Clubs
  VakifBank Ankara (1995-2000)
  Yeşilyurt (2000-2004)
  Eczacıbaşı VitrA (2004-2015)

Awards

Clubs
 1996-97 Turkish League -  Champion, with VakifBank Ankara
 1997-98 Turkish League -  Champion, with VakifBank Ankara
 2005-06 Turkish League -  Champion, with Eczacıbaşı Istanbul
 2006-07 Turkish League -  Champion, with Eczacıbaşı Istanbul
 2007-08 Turkish League -  Champion, with Eczacıbaşı Istanbul
 2011 Turkish Volleyball Super Cup -  Champion, with Eczacıbaşı VitrA
 2011-12 Turkish Cup -  Champion, with Eczacıbaşı VitrA
 2011-12 Aroma Women's Volleyball League -  Champion, with Eczacıbaşı VitrA
 2012 Turkish Volleyball Super Cup -  Champion, with Eczacıbaşı VitrA
 2012-2013 Turkish Women's Volleyball Cup -  Runner-Up, with Eczacıbaşı VitrA
 2012-2013 Turkish Women's Volleyball League -  Runner-Up, with Eczacıbaşı VitrA

National team
 2003 European Championship -  Silver Medal
 2009 Mediterranean Games -  Silver Medal
 2009 European League -  Silver Medal
 2010 European League -  Bronze Medal
 2011 European Championship - 
 2012 FIVB World Grand Prix -  Bronze Medal
 2013 Mediterranean Games -

See also
 Turkish women in sports

References

External links
 
 Eczacıbaşı Website
 
 
 

1982 births
Living people
Sportspeople from Ankara
Turkish women's volleyball players
VakıfBank S.K. volleyballers
Yeşilyurt volleyballers
Eczacıbaşı volleyball players
Olympic volleyball players of Turkey
Volleyball players at the 2012 Summer Olympics
Mediterranean Games medalists in volleyball
Mediterranean Games silver medalists for Turkey
Competitors at the 2009 Mediterranean Games
Competitors at the 2013 Mediterranean Games